The Electoral district of Counties of Murray, King and Georgiana and from 1851, Counties of King and Georgiana was an electorate of the partially elected New South Wales Legislative Council, created for the first elections for the Council in 1843. The electoral district included the south western counties of Murray, King and Georgiana. Polling took place at Queanbeyan, Yass and Wheeo, which were within the counties and the nearby towns of Braidwood, Goulburn and Bathurst. The towns of Queanbeyan and Yass were removed from the district with the expansion of the Council in 1851 and combined with Braidwood and Goulburn to form the Southern Boroughs. The rural area of the County of Murray became part of the Counties of Murray and St Vincent and leaving the district to cover the remaining rural areas of the Counties of King and Gergiana.

At all three elections, there was only one candidate who was therefore elected unopposed. In 1856 the unicameral Legislative Council was abolished and replaced with an elected Legislative Assembly and an appointed Legislative Council. The district was represented by the Legislative Assembly electorate of King and Georgiana.

Members

Terence Murray went on to represent the Southern Boroughs from September 1851.

Election results

1843

1848

1851

See also
Members of the New South Wales Legislative Council, 1843–1851

References

Former electoral districts of New South Wales Legislative Council
1843 establishments in Australia
1851 disestablishments in Australia